Eumetula aliceae is a species of sea snail, a gastropod in the family Newtoniellidae, which is known from European waters. It was described by Dautzenberg and Fischer H., in 1896.

References

Newtoniellidae
Gastropods described in 1896